Morris Alexander Stefaniw (born January 10, 1948) is a former professional ice hockey centreman. During the 1972–73 season, he appeared in 13 games for the NHL's Atlanta Flames. Born  in North Battleford, Saskatchewan, his lone NHL goal was the first goal in Flames' history and the first goal in the history of the Nassau Veterans Memorial Coliseum, during a 3–2 victory over the New York Islanders on October 7, 1972.

After his stint with the Flames, they sent him down to the Nova Scotia Voyageurs of the American Hockey League, the top farm club of the Montreal Canadiens, where he teamed up with Yvon Lambert (left wing) and Tony Featherstone (right wing), to become one of the most productive scoring lines in American Hockey League history. The three players combined for 131 goals and 177 assists, for 308 points, in the 1972–73 regular season, and 27 goals and 39 assists, for 66 points, in just 13 playoff games. The three players finished 1 (Lambert 104 points), 2 (Featherstone 103 points, 3 (Stefaniw 101 points) in the AHL scoring race that season. For a number of years, his 71 assists from that year was the team record.

Career statistics

Regular season and playoffs

Awards
 CMJHL First All-Star Team – 1967

References

External links
 

1948 births
Living people
Albuquerque Six-Guns players
Atlanta Flames players
Baltimore Clippers players
Canadian expatriate ice hockey players in the United States
Canadian ice hockey centres
Canadian people of Ukrainian descent
Ice hockey people from Saskatchewan
Johnstown Jets players
Nova Scotia Voyageurs players
Oklahoma City Blazers (1965–1977) players
Omaha Knights (CHL) players
Sportspeople from North Battleford
Phoenix Roadrunners (WHL) players
Providence Reds players